Hans Freyer (31 July 1887 – 18 January 1969) was a German conservative revolutionary sociologist and philosopher.

Life
Freyer began studying theology, national economics, history and philosophy at the University of Greifswald in 1907, with the aim of becoming a Lutheran theologian. A year later he moved to Leipzig, where he initially took the same courses, but then gave up the theological parts. He gained his doctorate in 1911. His early works on the philosophy of life had an influence on the German youth movement. In 1920 he qualified as a university lecturer, and in 1922 he became a professor at the university of Kiel.

In 1925, moving on to the University of Leipzig, Freyer founded the university's sociology department. He led the department until 1948. In Leipzig, he developed a branch of sociology with a strongly historical basis, the Leipzig School. Sympathizing with the Hitlerite movement, he forced Ferdinand Tönnies, an outspoken enemy of it, and then president of the Deutsche Gesellschaft für Soziologie, out of office in 1933.

Also in 1933 Freyer signed the Vow of allegiance of the Professors of the German Universities and High-Schools to Adolf Hitler and the National Socialistic State. Nevertheless, being Tönnies' successor he abstained from making the Gesellschaft a Nazi tool by stopping all activities from 1934 onwards. From 1938 to 1944 Freyer was the head of the German Institute for Culture in Budapest. Together with Walter Frank he established a racist and anti-semitic völkisch historiography.

Freyer was Protestant and married Käthe Lübeck; they had four children together.

After the Second World War, Freyer's position in Leipzig, now in the Soviet occupation zone, became untenable, and in 1948 he took up a position in Wiesbaden at the Brockhaus publishing company. He took up lecturing again for only another three years, from 1953 to 1955, at the University of Münster and for a short time in 1954 in Ankara where he helped set up an institute for sociology.

Works
In Der Staat (1926), Freyer identified three stages of history which repeated themselves in a cycle: Glaube, Stil and Staat (belief, style, the state). These were partly, although not openly, based on Ferdinand Tönnies' Gemeinschaft und Gesellschaft (community and society). The last stage, Staat, was the ideal state for society:  "the essential quality of the state (...) was its ability to forge living humanity with all its forces into a unity".

In 1929 Freyer wrote Soziologie als Wirklichkeitswissenschaft (Sociology as a "Science of Reality") (using Max Weber's term). This looked into the origins of sociology, saying that it came from the philosophy of history; that it had emerged from people's attempts to understand the connections between the past and the present. In Freyer's view, sociology was needed as a science to understand why changes in society had happened and, based on these findings, to help transform society.

Freyer's 1931 article Die Revolution von Rechts studied freedom, saying that people should be free only if they were part of a common will and that individual freedom should be limited for the sake of the community.

List of works
 Antäus. Grundlegung einer Ethik des bewußten Lebens, 1918
 Die Bewertung der Wirtschaft im philosophischen Denken des 19. Jahrhunderts, 1921
 Prometheus. Ideen zur Philosophie der Kultur, 1923
 Theorie des objektiven Geistes. Eine Einleitung in die Kulturphilosophie", 1923
 Der Staat, 1925
 Soziologie als Wirklichkeitswissenschaft. Logische Grundlegung des Systems der Soziologie, 1930
 Einleitung in die Soziologie, 1931
 Die Revolution von rechts, 1931    
 Herrschaft und Planung. Zwei Grundbegriffe der politischen Ethik, 1933
 Pallas Athene. Ethik des politischen Volkes, 1935
 Über Fichtes Machiavelli-Aufsatz, 1936
 Die politische Insel. Eine Geschichte der Utopien von Platon bis zur Gegenwart, 1936
 Vom geschichtlichen Selbstbewußtsein des 20. Jahrhunderts, 1937
 Gesellschaft und Geschichte, 1937
 Machiavelli, 1938
 Weltgeschichte Europas, 2 Bände, 1948
 Theorie des gegenwärtigen Zeitalters, 1955
 Schwelle der Zeiten. Beiträge zur Soziologie der Kultur, 1965
 Entwicklungstendenzen und Probleme der modernen Industriegesellschaft, in: Industriegesellschaft in Ost und West, Mainz
 Herrschaft, Planung und Technik. Aufsätze zur Soziologie, published and introduced by Elfriede Üner, 1987   
 
See also
 Arnold Gehlen
 Gotthard Günther
 Ernest Manheim
 Heinz Maus
 Helmut Schelsky

References

Further reading
 Freyer, Hans, 1998. Theory of Objective Mind: An Introduction to the Philosophy of Culture. Translated and with an introduction by Steven Grosby.
 Muller, Jerry Z., 1988. The Other God that Failed : Hans Freyer and the Deradicalization of German Conservatism. 
------, 2002. The Mind and the Market: Capitalism in Western Thought''. Anchor Books.

External links
  Fascism and the primacy of the political by Dick Pels

1887 births
1969 deaths
Conservative Revolutionary movement
German Lutherans
German sociologists
German Youth Movement
Academic staff of Leipzig University
People from the Kingdom of Saxony
University of Greifswald alumni
Academic staff of the University of Münster
German male writers
20th-century German philosophers
20th-century Lutherans